Fred Hepner (born 14 February 1940) is a former  Australian rules footballer who played with South Melbourne in the Victorian Football League (VFL).

Notes

External links 

Living people
1940 births
Australian rules footballers from Victoria (Australia)
Sydney Swans players